Charter Arms Co. is an American manufacturer of revolvers. Since its founding in 1964, Charter Arms has produced revolvers chambered in the following calibers: .22 Long Rifle, .22 Winchester Magnum, .32 Long, .32 H&R Magnum, .327 Federal Magnum, .38 Special, .357 Magnum, 9×19mm Parabellum, .40 Smith & Wesson, .41 Remington Magnum, .44 Special, .45 ACP, and .45 Colt. 

The most famous revolvers manufactured by Charter Arms are the .44 Special Bulldog and .38 Special Bulldog Pug.

History
Douglas McClenahan, a young gun designer who had previously worked for Colt, High Standard, and Sturm, Ruger founded Charter Arms in 1964 to produce handguns. His first pistol was a five-shot revolver called "The Undercover" chambered for .38 Special. McClenahan's innovation was to avoid using the side plate designs manufactured by other revolver makers for a one-piece frame, giving the new revolver a strength that allowed it to safely shoot high loads. McClenahan also reduced the number of moving parts used in the gun and created a safety device for the firing pin.

The company, then located in Stratford, Connecticut, went bankrupt in 1996, but the Charter design and mark were resurrected by Charter 2000, which was founded by the Ecker family. The new company capitalized on the fame of the old Charter Arms revolvers. Operations were moved to Shelton, Connecticut.

Basing their new line of weapons on the basic Charter Arms design, the new company has made a few improvements such as the use of a one-piece barrel and front sight. The one-piece barrels of the new models are machined with eight grooves instead of six for higher velocity, flatter trajectory and better accuracy. The new models feature a completely blocked hammer system so that the gun cannot fire unless the trigger is held in full rear position.

In addition to reintroducing the .38 Special Undercover and the .44 Special Bulldog, Charter 2000 produces revolvers chambered for .22 Long Rifle/.22 Magnum (the Pathfinder), .357 Magnum (the Mag Pug) and .38 Special (the Off-Duty and the Police Bulldog).

In 2005, Charter 2000 announced that it would be filing for bankruptcy, blaming the costs associated with nuisance lawsuits for their financial trouble.

In September 2005, MKS Supply entered into an agreement with Charter Arms where MKS Supply would handle the sales, marketing and distribution for Charter Arms.

In 2008, Charter Arms brought the new Patriot revolvers to the market. The Patriot revolvers were chambered for the .327 Federal Magnum, and were available in 2.2" or 4" stainless steel models. The Charter Arms web site as of August 2011 no longer lists this model under the products category.

Also in 2008, Charter Arms announced a new revolver: the Charter Arms Rimless Revolver. The new revolver would be able to load and fire rimless cartridges such as the 9mm, .40 S&W, and .45 ACP without the need for moon clips. Initially, the revolver was to ship in early spring, however, reported problems with the patents delayed the introduction. Charter Arms set a release date of April 2009 for the CARR. However, Charter Arms missed this deadline, and company representatives have suggested the release date may not be until "late July" of 2009. The CARR which was subsequently called the Pitbull finally reached production in August 2011 and the first Pitbull models had a 2.3" barrel and were chambered for the .40 S&W cartridge as this is the most popular U.S. law enforcement round and would enable the Pitbull to be used as a back-up gun to the .40 service pistol.

In October 2010 MKS discontinued the sales and marketing of Charter Arms. Charter now has taken over the sales and marketing function.

At SHOT Show 2018 Charter introduced the .41 Remington Magnum Mag Pug and the .45 Colt Bulldog XL.

Products

The Bulldog: .44 Special
The Bulldog XL/Bulldog .45 Colt: .45 Colt
The Target Bulldog: .357 Magnum
The Undercover: .38 Special
The Undercoverette: .32 H&R Magnum
The Professional: .32 H&R Magnum and .357 Magnum
The Mag Pug: .357 Magnum and .41 Remington Magnum (.41-caliber variant discontinued)
The Patriot: .327 Federal Magnum (discontinued)
The Pathfinder: .22 LR and .22 Magnum
The Off Duty: .38 Special (similar to the Undercover but with a bobbed hammer and weighing )
The Dixie Derringer: .22 LR and .22 Magnum
The Pitbull: 9×19mm Luger, .40 S&W, and .45 ACP (same frame as Bulldog and Pug)
The Southpaw: .38 Special (similar to Undercover, but made for left-handed shooters)

Criminal uses
A Charter Arms "Undercover" .38 Special model was used by Arthur Bremer to attempt to assassinate George Wallace in 1972.
The .44 Special Bulldog revolver gained notoriety after it was used by Son of Sam serial killer David Berkowitz in his murder spree.
A Charter Arms "Undercover" .38 Special model was used by Mark David Chapman to murder John Lennon on December 8, 1980.
A Charter Arms “Undercover” .38 Special was used by Mumia Abu-Jamal in the murder of Police Officer Daniel Faulkner on December 9, 1981.
A Charter Arms “Undercover” was used by Van Brett Watkins Sr. to assassinate Cherica Adams, the girlfriend of former Carolina Panthers football wide receiver Rae Carruth in a drive-by shooting in 1999.

References

.327 Federal Magnum firearms
Companies based in Fairfield County, Connecticut
Manufacturing companies established in 1964
Manufacturing companies based in Connecticut
Firearm manufacturers of the United States
Derringers
1964 establishments in Connecticut